Mandley is a surname of German or Slavic origin. Notable people with the surname include:

Jack Mandley (1909–1988), British footballer
Pete Mandley (born 1961), American football player

References

Surnames of German origin
Surnames of Slavic origin